El Bayadh (Arabic: ولاية البيض) is a province (wilaya) in Algeria, named after its capital El Bayadh. It is surrounded by mountains from the South, North, and Northeast of the state.

History
The province was created from Saïda Province in 1984.

Administrative divisions
The province is divided into 8 districts, which are further divided into 22 communes or municipalities.

Districts
 Boualem
 Bougtob
 Boussemghoun
 Brézina
 Chellala
 El Abiodh Sidi Cheikh
 El Bayadh
 Rogassa

Communes

 Arbaouet
 Aïn El Orak
 Boualem
 Bougtob
 Boussemghoun
 Brézina
 Cheguig
 Chellala
 El Abiodh Sidi Cheikh
 El Bayadh
 El Bnoud
 El Kheiter
 El Maharra
 Ghassoul
 Kef Lahmar
 Krakda
 Rogassa
 Sidi Ameur
 Sidi Slimane
 Sidi Taifour
 Stitten
 Tousmouline

References

 
Provinces of Algeria
States and territories established in 1984